FTI Consulting is a business advisory firm headquartered in Washington, D.C., United States. FTI is one of the largest financial consulting firms in the world and consistently ranks as one of the top global management consulting firms. The company specializes in the fields of corporate finance and restructuring, economic consulting, forensic and litigation consulting, strategic communications and technology. Founded as Forensic Technologies International Ltd in 1982, FTI Consulting employs more than 6,200 staff in 28 countries.

The firm was involved in the Lehman Brothers and General Motors bankruptcies, the investigation into the Bernard Madoff fraud, Bush v. Gore, and the Major League Baseball steroid investigation. As of January 2020, FTI Consulting had the largest restructuring business in the US.

History and Acquisitions
Forensic Technologies International was founded in 1982 by two engineers, Joseph Reynolds and Daniel Luczak, to provide expert witnesses for litigation and provide visual presentations to demonstrate complex technical issues for juries. Luczak later served as FTI's chairman from 1992 to 1998. The company went public in May 1996, raising $11.1 million and debuting at $8.50 a share. It was one of the first litigation support companies to be publicly traded.

Forensic Technologies International rebranded itself as FTI Consulting in 1998, and in 1999 began trading on the New York Stock Exchange as FCN. After 1998, FTI's business focused increasingly on "financial surgery on troubled companies, either through bankruptcy proceedings or in workout situations with creditors."

The company added over 1,000 employees to its Forensic and Litigation Consulting ("FLC") division since the passing of the 2002 Sarbanes-Oxley Act, which excluded auditors from providing consulting work to their public clients. FTI Consulting purchased PricewaterhouseCoopers' U.S. Business Recovery Services Division ("BRS") for $250 million in 2002, which at the time was the largest provider of bankruptcy, turnaround and business restructuring services in the United States. The company purchased KPMG's Dispute Advisory Services in 2003. The company purchased Chicago-based Compass Lexecon in 2003, maintaining the name as a subsidiary.

FTI acquired Ringtail Solutions Group in 2005.  Ringtail's signature product, the Ringtail Discovery Software Suite, provides e-discovery and document management tools to assist corporations and law firms during litigation engagements. FTI acquired Attenex Corporation in 2008 and merged Attenex Patterns with Ringtail Discovery Software Suite to form Ringtail 8 E-discovery Software.

In 2006 the company acquired the London-based communications consultancy Financial Dynamics ("FD"). FD is now referred to as the Strategic Communications Division of FTI. In 2007, FTI expanded into Latin America and reported US$1 billion in annual revenue for the first time.

In 2008, FTI purchased the Schonbraun McCann Group, a real estate consulting firm based in New York, and Forensic Accounting, a forensic accounting practice based in the UK.

In 2009, FTI Consulting was listed by Fortune as one of the 100 fastest growing U.S. companies.

In 2010, FS Asia Advisory Limited was acquired in Hong Kong, expanding FTI's activities in Asia. In January 2014, FTI Consulting acquired London-based TLG Partners, which produced a series of annual thought leader indexes. In the same month, Steven H. Gunby was named the firm's new president and chief executive officer.

In 2015, The Deal named FTI Consulting the world's top restructuring adviser to distressed companies.

In 2016, the company led the list of the International Who's Who of Commercial Arbitration for the sixth consecutive year.

In 2017, the Company acquired the CDG Group, a leading restructuring advisory, turnaround management, value enhancement and transaction advisory firm in New York.

Services 

FTI Consulting is organized into five business segments. The first, Corporate Finance and Restructuring, provides business turnaround services, including support for restructuring, litigation, insolvency, and interim management. The second, Economic & Financial Consulting, provides economic analysis and expert testimony for law firms, corporations and government agencies. The third, Forensic and Litigation Consulting, provides investigative data analysis and forensic accounting services, as well as construction solutions services. The fourth, Strategic Communications, offers public relations services for "clients managing financial, regulatory and reputational challenges." The fifth, Technology, provides specialized software to manage the risks involved in e-discovery.

FTI's employees include specialists in banking, forensic accounting, real estate, intellectual property, crisis communication, and construction.

Partnerships 
FTI Consulting has established partnerships with companies and organizations in several fields. It is a member of the World Economic Forum. Some of the company's senior and regional leaders participate in the Forum's meetings, participating in several projects related to anti-corruption, energy and professional services principles.

See also
 ArmorGroup
 Eurasia Group
 Le Beck International
 Pinkerton
 Edelman (firm)
 Finsbury (public relations)
 Teneo

References 

Financial services companies of the United States
Companies listed on the New York Stock Exchange
Financial services companies established in 1982
Consulting firms established in 1982
American companies established in 1982
1982 establishments in Washington, D.C.
International management consulting firms
Macroeconomics consulting firms
1996 initial public offerings